The Oksan Seowon is a seowon located at Oksan-ri, Angang-eup in the city of Gyeongju, North Gyeongsang Province, South Korea. Seowon is a type of local academy during the Joseon Dynasty (1392–1897). It was established by Yi Je-min, (李齊閔), the minister of Gyeongju and local Confucian scholars in 1572, the fifth year of King Seonjo's reign, to commemorate the scholarly achievement and virtue of Confucian scholar and politician Yi Eon-jeok (1491–1553).

Hoejae Yeongjeok left office and built the main building as the main building in the stream of Oksan in Gyeongju's Angang-eup near Yangdong Village. For this reason, after Hoejae died, Oksan Seowon was built near Dokrakdang. Oksan Seowon is located in Seshimdae, and it means to wash one's mind with water falling from Yongchu and seek learning through nature.

See also
Dosan Seowon
Korean Confucianism

References

External links
 옥산서원 (玉山書院) at Yesullo

Seowon
Buildings and structures in Gyeongju
1572 establishments in Asia